Alexander Sergeyevich Nikolaev (born 30 January 1990) is a Russian sprint canoer who has competed since the late 2000s. He won a bronze medal in the K-1 4 x 200 m event at the 2010 ICF Canoe Sprint World Championships in Poznań.

References
Canoe'09.ca profile

1990 births
Living people
Russian male canoeists
ICF Canoe Sprint World Championships medalists in kayak